Nikolay Vasilyevich Kolesnikov (born 8 September 1953 in Kargaly, Almaty, Kazakh SSR) is a retired 100 metres runner who represented the USSR. He won a bronze medal at the 1976 Summer Olympics as well as the 60 metres at the 1978 European Indoor Championships. Kolesnikov trained at Burevestnik in Leningrad.

Achievements

References

External links

1953 births
Living people
Kazakhstani male sprinters
Soviet male sprinters
Burevestnik (sports society) athletes
Athletes (track and field) at the 1976 Summer Olympics
Olympic athletes of the Soviet Union
Olympic bronze medalists for the Soviet Union
European Athletics Championships medalists
Olympic bronze medalists in athletics (track and field)
Universiade medalists in athletics (track and field)
Universiade gold medalists for the Soviet Union
Medalists at the 1976 Summer Olympics
Medalists at the 1977 Summer Universiade